The canton of Rochechouart is an administrative division of the Haute-Vienne department, western France. Its borders were modified at the French canton reorganisation which came into effect in March 2015. Its seat is in Rochechouart.

It consists of the following communes:
 
Champagnac-la-Rivière
Champsac
La Chapelle-Montbrandeix
Chéronnac
Cognac-la-Forêt
Cussac
Dournazac
Gorre
Maisonnais-sur-Tardoire
Marval
Oradour-sur-Vayres
Pensol
Rochechouart
Saint-Auvent
Saint-Bazile
Saint-Cyr
Sainte-Marie-de-Vaux
Saint-Laurent-sur-Gorre
Saint-Mathieu
Les Salles-Lavauguyon
Vayres
Videix

References

Cantons of Haute-Vienne